Ashburn station may refer to:

 Ashburn station (Illinois) in Ashburn, Chicago, Illinois
 Ashburn station (Washington Metro) in Loudoun County, Virginia